The Democratic Alliance Party  was a political party was Tunisia founded on 8 November 2012. Shortly after its creation, the party had 9 representatives in the constituent assembly who left the Progressive Democratic Party. Its secretary general was Mohamed Hamdi. The party merged into the Democratic Current in October 2017.

References

2012 establishments in Tunisia
Political parties established in 2012
2017 disestablishments in Tunisia
Political parties disestablished in 2017
Defunct political parties in Tunisia